Loïck Lespinasse (born 20 July 2000) is a French professional footballer who plays as a forward for  club Pau FC. Born in France, he  has previously played for Genêts Anglet and Real Sociedad.

Club career 
Lespinnasse played at the Genêts Anglet from 2018 to 2019, then the forward joined the cantera of Real Sociedad, based in San Sebastián in 2019. 

He signed his first professional contract in February 2021 and played with Real Sociedad B.

On 11 January 2023, Real Sociedad announced the transfer of Lespinasse to French club Pau Football Club of Ligue 2, where he signed a two-year contract.

Lespinasse made his debut on 22 January 2023, coming on as a substitute against Lille OSC during a 2-0 defeat in Coupe de France

References

External links 
 

2000 births
People from Bergerac, Dordogne
Sportspeople from Dordogne
Footballers from Nouvelle-Aquitaine
Living people
French footballers
Real Sociedad B footballers
Pau FC players
Segunda Federación players
Primera Federación players
Ligue 1 players
French expatriate footballers
Expatriate footballers in Spain
French expatriate sportspeople in Spain